The 1947 Major League Baseball All-Star Game was the 14th playing of the "Midsummer Classic" between Major League Baseball's (MLB) American League (AL) and National League (NL) All-Star teams. The All-Star Game was held on July 8, 1947, at Wrigley Field in Chicago, the home of the NL's Chicago Cubs.

The game resulted in the American League defeating the National League by a score of 2–1 in 2 hours and 19 minutes.

All-Star managers and coaches
The National League manager was Eddie Dyer of the St. Louis Cardinals, and the NL coaches were Philadelphia Phillies manager Ben Chapman and New York Giants player-manager Mel Ott.

The American League manager was Joe Cronin of the Boston Red Sox, and the AL coaches were Red Sox coach Del Baker and Detroit Tigers manager Steve O'Neill.

All-Star team rosters
The starting pitchers were selected by the respective American and National League managers. The eight position starters were chosen by the fans.
Players in italics have since been inducted into the National Baseball Hall of Fame.

American League

Reserves

National League

Reserves

* This player did not start.
# This player did not play.

All-Star Game

Ceremonies
The ceremonial first pitch was thrown by Happy Chandler, Commissioner of Baseball.

Starting lineups

Umpires

The umpires changed assignments in the middle of the fifth inning – Conlan and Passarella swapped positions, also Boyer and Henline swapped positions.

Game summary

The first three and a half innings were scoreless with four hits between both teams. Johnny Mize hit a home run off of Spec Shea to deep right field in the bottom of the fourth inning to put the National League ahead 1–0. In the top of the sixth, Luke Appling scored from third base as Joe DiMaggio hit into a 6–4–3 double play to again tie the game.

Stan Spence, pinch hitting for Shea, singled to right-center field in the top of the seventh inning, scoring Bobby Doerr from third base to give the American League the lead. Doerr had made it to third after pitcher Johnny Sain failed a pickoff attempt to second baseman Eddie Stanky.

The NL's tying and winning runs in the form of Phil Cavarretta and Phil Masi (pinch running for Johnny Mize) were on third and first bases respectively in the bottom of the eighth inning, with Enos Slaughter at bat. Slaughter grounded out to shortstop Joe Boudreau, and pitcher Joe Page got out of the inning with the AL still on top, 2–1.

Warren Spahn and the National League squad held off any more offense by the AL in the final inning, again giving them a chance to win it in their half of the ninth. Whitey Kurowski grounded out to Bobby Doerr at second and Pee Wee Reese walked to put the tying run on first. Eddie Stanky grounded out to Doerr also, preventing Reese from advancing. Schoolboy Rowe came to bat, pinch hitting for the pitcher Spahn. Rowe flew out to right fielder Tommy Henrich to give the American League a 2–1 victory.

American League

Batting:
2B: Gordon (1, Brecheen), Williams (1, Brecheen).
TB: Williams 3, Gordon 2, Boudreau, Doerr, Spence, Appling, DiMaggio.
GIDP: DiMaggio (1).
RBI: Spence (1).
2-out RBI: Spence.
Team LOB: 6.
With RISP: 2-for-12.

Baserunning:
SB: Doerr (1, 2nd off Sain/Edwards).
Pickoffs: Doerr (2nd by Sain).

National League

Batting:
HR: Mize (1, Shea; 4th inning, 0 on, 2 outs).
TB: Mize 5, Pafko, Marion, Haas.
RBI: Mize (1).
2-out RBI: Mize.
Team LOB: 8.
Team RISP: 0-for-2.

Fielding:
E: Sain (1).
DP: 1 (Reese-Stanky-Mize).
PB: Cooper (1).

WP: Blackwell (1).
Pickoffs: Sain (0; Doerr, 2nd).
Umpires: HP – Jocko Conlan, 1B – Jim Boyer, 2B – Butch Henline, 3B – Art Passarella.
Time : 2:19.
Attendance: 41,123.

References

Major League Baseball All-Star Game
Major League Baseball All-Star Game
Major League Baseball All Star Game
July 1947 sports events in the United States
1940s in Chicago
Baseball competitions in Chicago